Gaurav Kumar (born 4 July 1996) is an Indian cricketer. He made his first-class debut for Delhi in the 2018–19 Ranji Trophy on 20 November 2018. He made his Twenty20 debut for Delhi in the 2018–19 Syed Mushtaq Ali Trophy on 2 March 2019. He made his List A debut on 16 October 2019, for Delhi in the 2019–20 Vijay Hazare Trophy.

References

External links
 

1996 births
Living people
Indian cricketers
Delhi cricketers
Place of birth missing (living people)